To testify, in law or religion, is to provide testimony, a solemn attestation of truth.

Testify may also refer to:

Albums
 Testify (Caleb Johnson album) or the title song, 2014
 Testify (Dynamic Praise album) or the title song, 2007
 Testify (M People album) or the title song (see below), 1999
 Testify (P.O.D. album), 2006
 Testify (Phil Collins album) or the title song, 2002
 Testify! (album), by Jon Stevens, 2011
 The Simpsons: Testify, a compilation from The Simpsons TV series, or the title song, 2007

EPs
 Testify (The Damned EP) or the title song, 1997
 Testify (The Knocks EP), 2017

Songs
 "Testify" (Common song), 2005
 "Testify" (Isley Brothers song), 1964
 "Testify" (M People song), 1998
 "Testify" (Parliament song), 1974
 "Testify" (Rage Against the Machine song), 1999
 "Testify!" (song), by Hifi Sean, 2016
 "(I Wanna) Testify", by the Parliaments, 1967
 "Testify", by August Alsina from Testimony, 2014
 "Testify", by Ben Haenow from Ben Haenow, 2015
 "Testify", by Conrad Sewell from Life, 2019
 "Testify", by Future from Hndrxx, 2017
 "Testify", by Meat Loaf from Couldn't Have Said It Better, 2003
 "Testify", by Melissa Etheridge from Brave and Crazy, 1989
 "Testify", by Needtobreathe from Hard Love, 2016
 "Testify", by Nick Jonas from Last Year Was Complicated, 2016
 "Testify", by Stevie Ray Vaughan and Double Trouble from Texas Flood, 1983